The Federation of the Jewish Communities in Romania (FCER) is an cultural association in Romania representing the Jewish community. The FCER has right to one seat in the Chamber of Deputies.

History
The organisation was originally founded as the Federation of Unions of Jewish Communities in Romania (FUCER) in 1936 by the Unions of Communities of the Old Kingdom and of the Provinces, which included the Union of Jewish Communities of the Old Kingdom, the Union of Jewish Communities of Transylvania and Banat, the Union of Jewish Communities of Bucovina, and the Union of Jewish Communities of Bessarabia. The first elected president of the organisation was Sigmund Birman, a philanthropist and industrialist. From 1941 to 1944 it was banned by the government of dictator Ion Antonescu, and replaced with the pro-government Jewish Centre of Romania, before being re-established in 1945. It took on its current name in 1949.

The FCER contested the 1996 general elections, receiving 12,746 votes (0.1%) and winning a single seat in the Chamber of Deputies under the electoral law allowing organisations representing ethnic minority groups to be exempt from the electoral threshold only applied as long as they received 10% of the vote required for a single seat in the Chamber of Deputies. The Jewish communities body has won a seat in every election since.

Electoral history

Leaders
 Sigmund Birman (1936–1940)
 Wilhelm Filderman (1940–1941; 1945–1947)
 Maximilian Popper (1948–1951)
 Israel Bacalu (1951–1961)
 Moses Rosen (1964–1994)
 Nicolae Cajal (1994–2004)
 Iulian Sorin (interim, 2004–2005)
 Aurel Vainer (2005–2020)
 Silviu Vexler (since 2020)

See also
Jewish Party, a Jewish political party in Romania between 1931 and 1948.
Union of Romanian Jews, a Jewish political organisation in Romania (1909-1938 and 1944-1946)
Jewish Democratic Committee, a Communist-aligned organisation representing the Jewish community in Romania between 1945 and 1953.

References

External links
Official website

Jews and Judaism in Romania
Jewish organizations
Non-registered political parties in Romania
Political parties of minorities in Romania